Sangudo is a hamlet in Alberta, Canada within Lac Ste. Anne County.

Sangudo was formerly incorporated as a village on April 12, 1937, but dissolved and reverted to hamlet status effective September 16, 2007.  Its sister village is Bukovina nad Labem in the Czech Republic.

Demographics 

Industry 
The main sources of revenue for the hamlet are tourism from traffic along Highway 43, oil production, and agriculture (mostly cattle ranching).

Attractions 

The hamlet is the home to Sangudo Speedway – a high-banked dirt oval that is a quarter mile in length. Sangudo also features a sundial tourist monument that can be seen from Highway 43.
Speedway is closed and there is amazing camping at Deep Creek Campground right on the pembina in sangudo

Notable people 
Gene Zwozdesky Alberta teacher, musician, politician (12th Speaker of the Alberta Legislative Assembly), grew up in Sangudo.

See also 
List of communities in Alberta
List of former urban municipalities in Alberta
List of hamlets in Alberta

References 

Designated places in Alberta
Former villages in Alberta
Hamlets in Alberta
Lac Ste. Anne County
Populated places disestablished in 2007